Pantelodes satellitia is a moth in the family Apatelodidae. It is found in Costa Rica, French Guiana and Bolivia. It was transferred from Apatelodes to the newly-established genus Pantelodes by Daniel Herbin in 2017.

References

Natural History Museum Lepidoptera generic names catalog

Apatelodidae
Moths described in 1855